Akie Abe (Abe Akie; née Matsuzaki; born 10 June 1962) is a Japanese radio DJ and the widow of Shinzo Abe, who served as Prime Minister of Japan from 2006 to 2007 and again from 2012 to 2020.

Early life

Abe was born . She is from a wealthy Japanese family; her father is the former president of Morinaga & Co., one of Japan's largest confectionery companies.

She was educated at Sacred Heart School in Tokyo (or Seishin Joshi Gakuin), a Roman Catholic private elementary through high school, then graduated from Sacred Heart Professional Training College. Abe later worked for Dentsu Inc., the world's largest advertising agency, before marrying Shinzo Abe in 1987. The couple had no children, having undergone unsuccessful fertility treatments earlier in their marriage.

In the late 1990s, Abe worked as a radio disc jockey in her husband's hometown of Shimonoseki. She was popular in the broadcast area and was known by her jockey name, "Akky".

Public life 
Following her husband's first stint as prime minister, she opened an organic izakaya in the Kanda district of Tokyo, but was not active in management due to the urging of her mother-in-law. She received a master's degree in Social Design Studies from Rikkyo University in March 2011.

Akie became popularly known as the "domestic opposition party" due to her outspoken views, which often contradicted her husband's. Abe is also known as a supporter of sexual minorities and the LGBT community. On April 27, 2014, she joined the gay pride parade in Tokyo to show her support for broader rights to Japan's LGBT community. In 2015, she was photographed standing in a field of cannabis plants promoting the revival of the cannabis culture in Japan.

While her husband was in office, Abe developed a close relationship with the Moritomo Gakuen kindergarten in Osaka, which is noted for its conservative and militarist culture, including requiring students to memorize the Imperial Rescript on Education. Abe was named as honorary principal of Mizuho no Kuni, an elementary school under development by Moritomo Gakuen, but resigned in February 2017 after it was discovered that Moritomo Gakuen had purchased the land for the school from the government for 14% of its appraised value. The Moritomo Gakuen scandal highlighted the complicated role of the prime minister's wife in Japan: although Abe herself was not considered a civil servant, she was supported by a staff of five civil servants seconded from the Ministry of Foreign Affairs and the Ministry of Economy, Trade and Industry, thus implying that her role carries public duties.

Akie was the first spouse of a Japanese prime minister to actively use social media, and was particularly personally active on Facebook and Instagram, but dramatically reduced her social media activities and changed the style of her posts in the wake of the Moritomo Gakuen scandal.

References

External links 

1962 births
Housewives
Japanese radio personalities
Japanese Roman Catholics
Japanese socialites
Japanese LGBT rights activists
Living people
People from Shimonoseki
People from Tokyo
Rikkyo University alumni
Spouses of prime ministers of Japan
Shinzo Abe